The Kapiti Coast District is a local government district of the Wellington Region in the lower North Island of New Zealand, 50 km north of Wellington City.

The population of the district is concentrated in the chain of coastal settlements along State Highway One: Ōtaki, Te Horo, Waikanae, Paraparaumu, Raumati Beach, Raumati South, and Paekākāriki. Paraparaumu is the most populous of these towns and the commercial and administrative centre. Much of the rural land is given over to horticulture; market gardens are common along the highway between the settlements. The area available for agriculture and settlement is narrow and coastal. Much of the eastern part of the district is within the Tararua Forest Park, which covers the rugged Tararua Range, with peaks rising to over 1500 m.

Geography 

The Kapiti Coast District stretches from Ōtaki in the north to Paekākāriki in the south. It includes the towns of Te Horo, Waikanae, Paraparaumu, Raumati Beach, Raumati South, and smaller localities such as Maungakōtukutuku, Otaihanga, and Peka Peka. It extends from the Tasman Sea coast to the top of the Tararua Range. Kapiti Island, a prominent offshore feature, is part of the district.

The district is not generally considered part of the Wellington metropolitan area, being distant from Wellington City, Porirua and the Hutt Valley, which make up the nucleus of the area. Still, Waikanae is considered by many to be the absolute northernmost point Wellington can be considered to reach as a city. Many residents travel into Wellington each day for work, and the district is a popular weekend destination for the people of the Wellington Region. The town of Paraparaumu, considered the pivot of the district, is located about 55 km north of Wellington.

The area has an oceanic climate with moderate temperature swings between seasons, resulting in warm summers and mild winters without any severe heat waves or cold spells.

Populated places 
Kapiti Coast District consists of the following towns, localities, settlements and communities:

 Ōtaki Ward:
 Ōtaki
 Ōtaki Beach
 Te Horo
 Te Horo Beach
 Hautere
 Forest Lakes
 Marycrest
 Ōtaki North

 Paekākāriki-Raumati Ward:
 Paekākāriki Area:
 Paekākāriki
 Queen Elizabeth Park
 Moonshine Valley
 Mackay
 Emerald Green
 Whareroa
 Raumati Area:
 Raumati Beach
 Raumati South
 Whareroa

 Paraparaumu Ward:
 Paraparaumu
 Paraparaumu Beach
 Maungakōtukutuku
 Otaihanga
 Nīkau Valley
 Tūteremoana

 Waikanae Ward:
 Waikanae
 Reikorangi
 Waikanae Beach
 Peka Peka
 Waikanae Downs

History 
Māori chief Te Rauparaha established a base on Kapiti Island, and from this position, he was able to launch attacks on other tribes during the Musket Wars of the early 19th century.  Around this time, Europeans began whaling in the area, and on 16 October 1839, William Wakefield of the New Zealand Company arrived in the Kapiti region to purchase land for permanent European settlement.  Te Rauparaha sold him land in the Nelson and Golden Bay area.

European settlement of the Kapiti Coast only took place on a significant scale after the Wellington and Manawatu Railway Company (WMR) opened its railway line from Wellington to Longburn, just south of Palmerston North. The line was opened in 1886, with the final spike driven in on the Kapiti Coast at Otaihanga. Paekākāriki was quickly established as a significant steam locomotive depot due to the need to swap locomotives at the location; powerful, heavy locomotives were required to handle trains over the rugged section from Wellington to Paekākāriki, while lighter, faster locomotives were more suited to the relatively flat terrain north of Paekākāriki.  In 1908, the WMR was purchased by the New Zealand Railways Department, who incorporated the line into the North Island Main Trunk railway.

In June 1940, the Wellington-Paekākāriki section was electrified as electric locomotives provided better motive power.  This meant trains would swap from steam (and later diesel-electric) to electric traction in Paekākāriki and it retained its status as a significant locomotive depot.  It also became the northern terminus of the Wellington commuter railway network until 8 May 1983, when it was extended to Paraparaumu. In February 2011 electrification reached Waikanae, which became the new terminus.

During World War II, Queen Elizabeth Park – a large tract of parkland between Raumati South and Paekākāriki – was the location of two United States Army and Marines camps, McKay and Russell.  US troops were stationed at the camps in 1942–44 prior to being sent into combat in the Pacific Ocean theatre.

After World War II, Wellington's Rongotai Airport was closed due to safety reasons in 1947 and Kapiti Coast Airport became the main airport for the Wellington Region. In 1949, it was New Zealand's busiest airport and helped to stimulate growth on the Kapiti Coast.  The Wellington International Airport was opened in 1959 and Paraparaumu Airport never regained its status, with some of its land sold for residential development in the 1990s and 2000s.

Administration

District Council
The parts of the district south of the Waikanae River were originally part of the now defunct Hutt County. The Kapiti Borough Council was carved from it in 1973.

In New Zealand's local government reforms of 1989, the borough council was replaced by the Kapiti Coast District Council, and the area under its jurisdiction expanded northwards to include Waikanae and Ōtaki, which had been part of the Horowhenua County. The council, now styled Kāpiti Coast District Council, is a territorial authority elected by residents every three years. It consists of a mayor and 10 councillors. Two councillors are elected for the Paraparaumu ward, one each for the Ōtaki, Paekākāriki-Raumati and Waikanae wards, and five are elected at-large. Kapiti Island is part of the Paraparaumu ward.

Although "Kapiti Coast District" is the official name of the district, the council uses the spelling "Kāpiti" for its name. Despite sharing the same spelling, the name is unrelated to the Māori word for "cabbage".

Community boards
The Kāpiti Coast District Council has created five local community boards, under the provisions of Part 4 of the Local Government Act 2002, covering the district:

The Paekākāriki Community Board representing the area including Paekākāriki, Emerald Glen and Whareroa Road in the north;
The Paraparaumu Community Board representing the area from Paraparaumu through to Otaihanga;
The Raumati Community Board representing the area including Raumati Beach and Raumati South;
The Waikanae Community Board representing the area from Waikanae Downs in the south through to Peka Peka in the north;
The Ōtaki Community Board representing the area including north of Marycrest, Te Horo, Ōtaki North to Forest Lakes.

Community boards are primarily advocates for their local area and they also administer community grant funding.

Regional Council
Greater Wellington Regional Council is responsible for regional governance of the district and the wider region, including public transport, water and environmental management.

Demographics

Many of the residents work in Wellington.

The population of the district has grown rapidly since the 1980s, fuelled in large part by Wellingtonians moving there to retire.

2018 census
Kapiti Coast District had a population of 53,673 at the 2018 New Zealand census, an increase of 4,569 people (9.3%) since the 2013 census, and an increase of 7,476 people (16.2%) since the 2006 census. There were 21,753 households. There were 25,314 males and 28,359 females, giving a sex ratio of 0.89 males per female. The median age was 47.9 years (compared with 37.4 years nationally), with 9,285 people (17.3%) aged under 15 years, 7,386 (13.8%) aged 15 to 29, 22,935 (42.7%) aged 30 to 64, and 14,067 (26.2%) aged 65 or older.

Ethnicities were 87.7% European/Pākehā, 14.7% Māori, 3.0% Pacific peoples, 4.6% Asian, and 2.2% other ethnicities. People may identify with more than one ethnicity.

The percentage of people born overseas was 22.6, compared with 27.1% nationally.

Although some people objected to giving their religion, 52.9% had no religion, 35.8% were Christian, 0.5% were Hindu, 0.1% were Muslim, 0.6% were Buddhist and 2.7% had other religions.

Of those at least 15 years old, 10,188 (23.0%) people had a bachelor or higher degree, and 7,167 (16.1%) people had no formal qualifications. The median income was $29,700, compared with $31,800 nationally. 7,950 people (17.9%) earned over $70,000 compared to 17.2% nationally. The employment status of those at least 15 was that 18,792 (42.3%) people were employed full-time, 6,435 (14.5%) were part-time, and 1,596 (3.6%) were unemployed.

Attractions 
Apart from Kapiti Island, one of the most visible features of the Kapiti Coast is Queen Elizabeth Park. Lying to the south of Raumati, it is a popular attraction that covers some 12 km². It extends to Paekākāriki, and includes the Wellington Tramway Museum.

Other tourist attractions include:
Kapiti Island is an iconic landmark, providing a symbol for a number of local businesses and groups. The island has several walks and trails, and contains species of protected native birdlife. Access to the nature reserve is by approved tour groups only.
The Kapiti Coast Museum in Waikanae has a wide range of historic collections including object and clothing displays, archives, hands-on exhibits, a reconstruction of a historic Kapiti Coast domestic layout, plus military and 19th century communications equipment.
Ōtaki-Māori Racing Club is New Zealand's only Māori racing club; it was formed in 1886, and holds eight race meetings annually.
Ōtaki Museum houses documents, photographs, oral histories and artifacts of significance to the history of Ōtaki and the surrounding district.
Queen Elizabeth Park contains the Wellington Tramway Museum and a number of coastal walking tracks.  It also hosts orienteering events.
Paekakariki Station Museum has displays of local Maori and heritage items along with sections devoted to railways and the US Marines occupation of the McKays Crossing area during World War II. It is located in the historic Paekakariki Railway Station building.
Steam Incorporated, a railway preservation society, is based in the Paekakariki Railway Yard. Steam Inc.'s depot, known as "The Engine Shed", where locomotives and rolling stock are restored and displayed, and the society is also one of the few operators of steam-hauled excursions on New Zealand's national railway network.
One of the Southern Hemisphere's largest car collections is at the Southward Car Museum in Otaihanga.
Paekakariki Escarpment Walkway is a walking track that goes between Paekākāriki and Pukerua Bay railway station. It is part of Te Araroa walkway that traverses New Zealand from north to south.
Paraparaumu Golf Course.

Economy and transport
The Kapiti Coast is well known for its cheeses and other products from Lindale. Light industry is focused in Paraparaumu and Ōtaki, with small clusters in Waikanae and Raumati.

Many of the Kapiti Coast's residents are not employed in the area.  Instead, they commute to jobs in Wellington. Transdev operates electric commuter trains along a portion of the North Island Main Trunk Railway referred to as the Kapiti Line on behalf of Metlink (the Greater Wellington public transport brand), and the KiwiRail Capital Connection commuter train from Palmerston North to Wellington provides a service for commuters north of the electric terminus in Waikanae. Metlink also provides regular local bus services throughout the Kapiti Coast, operated by Uzabus.

In February 2017 an 18 km (11 mi) long expressway diversion from Mackays Crossing north of Paekākāriki to just north of Peka Peka, was opened to enable State Highway 1 to bypass developed urban areas. An extension to just north of Ōtaki opened in December 2022.

State Highway One connects the Kapiti Coast to Wellington. Before the long-mooted Transmission Gully Motorway opened in March 2022, the road (now re-designated State Highway 59) was a narrow, highly congested coastal highway and has been subject to occasional closure due to landslides.

The district is on the North Island Main Trunk railway line (NIMT) and served as far north as Waikanae by suburban passenger trains on the Kapiti Line, one of Wellington's three Metlink commuter rail links. There are also commuter bus services.

The small Kapiti Coast Airport is sandwiched between Paraparaumu (to the north) and Raumati (to the south). With three runways (one of which is now closed), it once served as the main airport of the Wellington region, but was until recently used mainly by aeroclubs. In 2011 scheduled commercial flights from Kapiti to Auckland resumed. It also has daily scheduled flights across Cook Strait to Nelson and Blenheim.  After Air New Zealand withdrew air services in April 2018, Air Chathams announced that they would be launching flights to Auckland from August 2018. Sounds Air also operates from the airport, and it is used for flight training and for private and hobby flights.

Film and television
Film director Peter Jackson is from Pukerua Bay and went to high school at Kapiti College in Raumati Beach.  Scenes from his movies Lord of the Rings and King Kong were filmed on the Kapiti Coast. Some of the seminal battle scenes in the fields in front of Minas Tirith in The Lord of the Rings: The Return of the King were shot in part at Queen Elizabeth Park.  Kapiti Island figured in King Kong with the scenes approaching the lost island of King Kong shot in the waters between Raumati Beach and the island.

Sport 
Rugby union clubs based in the area include Paraparaumu RFC, Waikanae RFC, Rahui RFC, and Toa RFC. Horowhenua Kapiti represent the district in the Heartland Championship.

Kapiti has been represented in rugby league by the Kapiti Bears – Kapiti Coast Rugby League Club Inc., which was founded in the 1970s and was the home of Kiwi and Melbourne Storm player Stephen Kearney.  The Kapiti Bears operate out of Matthews Park, Menin Road, and are affiliated with the Wellington Rugby League Association.

In association football, Kapiti is represented by Kapiti Coast United, who play at Weka Park in Raumati Beach.  The club was formed by the merger of Raumati Hearts and Paraparaumu United in 2003.

Paraparaumu Track and Field Club is the athletics club based in Paraparaumu, with facilities at the Paraparaumu Domain.

News media 
The Kapiti Coast has four news sources owned and operated on the coast.
 Kapiti News – a newspaper run by New Zealand Herald and a part of NZME
 BeachFM – local owned radio station broadcasting on 106.3 FM
 What's On Kapiti – online news source publishing about Kapiti  
 Kapiti Observer – free newspaper delivering to homes and run by Stuff

References

External links

 Kāpiti Coast District Council
 What's On Kapiti
 Beach FM

 
Local government in New Zealand
Landforms of the Wellington Region
Coastline of New Zealand